"Shy Away" is a song written and recorded by American musical duo Twenty One Pilots. It was released on April 7, 2021, through Fueled by Ramen, as the lead single from their sixth studio album, Scaled and Icy. A music video was released alongside the single, directed by Miles Cable and AJ Favicchio.

Background

Tyler Joseph, the frontman of the duo, wrote "Shy Away" for his younger brother, Jay Joseph, as a tutorial on how to operate a recording studio. During the recording, Joseph's daughter made a cooing noise which Joseph decided to keep in the song.

The song was created while communicating virtually as the COVID-19 pandemic limited interaction between the members of the band. It was released two days after the announcement of Scaled and Icy, the band's sixth studio album.

Composition
"Shy Away" is a "propulsive" synth-pop, alternative rock, indie rock, and pop rock song that runs for a duration of two minutes and fifty-five seconds. According to the sheet music published at Musicnotes.com by Alfred Music, it is written in the time signature of common time at a tempo of 196 beats per minute. "Shy Away" is composed in the key of C major, while Joseph's vocal range spans one octave and three notes, from a low E3 to a high of A4.

The track includes a "brief but tasteful" half-time breakdown for the "hardcore kids", and has been compared to the likes of artists such as the Strokes and Phoenix. It's considered to be one of the band's upbeat songs, and is synth-heavy, with elements of electronic, pop and indie music.

Music video
The music video for the song, directed by Miles Cable and AJ Favicchio, was released concurrently with the song. The video showcases the duo's new "era", and a new color scheme which changes during each album cycle. The video features the new colors prominently: vibrant shades of light blue, pink and occasional yellow. In the video, a few background musicians portrayed by Joseph and Dun wear torn and burnt ski masks, a reference to the stylings of their earlier albums, Vessel and Blurryface. As of April 2022, the video has surpassed 45 million views on YouTube.

Commercial performance
Within only two days of tracking, "Shy Away" made its debut at No. 20 on the US Billboard Hot Rock & Alternative Songs chart, and reached a peak of No. 7. On the Alternative Airplay chart, the song peaked at No. 1, and remained at the peak position for 8 weeks. On the Rock Airplay chart, the track also reached No. 1. In its first full week of tracking, it reached No. 56 in both the United Kingdom and Ireland, and peaked at No. 36 in Lithuania. On the chart dated April 24, 2021, the song made its debut on the US Billboard Hot 100 at No. 87, also being the only track from the album to chart there, before falling out the week after.

Personnel
Credits adapted from the liner notes of Scaled and Icy.
 Tyler Joseph  vocals, guitar, bass, keyboards, synthesizers, programming, production
 Josh Dun  drums, percussion

Charts

Weekly charts

Year-end charts

Certifications

References

External links

2021 singles
Twenty One Pilots songs
Fueled by Ramen singles
American alternative rock songs
American synth-pop songs
Songs written by Tyler Joseph
2021 songs